Kerry Ann Christiansen is a British actress who began her career in the popular British children’s TV series Byker Grove.

After her character's departure from the show, she went on to play Kim Cotton in the short lived ITV series Close and True, which also starred Robson Green and Jamie Bell, and she made a powerful cameo playing Bridget in the 2000 film Purely Belter.

Kerry Ann went on to study Media Production at the University of Sunderland before returning to being in front of the camera to star in the 2005 short film Trainlines.

Films
Trainlines (2005)
Purely Belter (2000)

TV series
Close and True (2000)
Byker Grove (1993–1997)

External links

English film actresses
English television actresses
Living people
Alumni of the University of Sunderland
Year of birth missing (living people)